The 10th Orgburo of the Russian Communist Party (Bolsheviks) was elected by the 1st Plenary Session of the  10th Central Committee, in the immediate aftermath of the 10th Congress.

Full members

Candidate members

References

Members of the Orgburo of the Central Committee of the Communist Party of the Soviet Union
1921 establishments in Russia
1922 disestablishments in the Soviet Union